Bjarte Bruland (born 11 April 1969) is a Norwegian historian. He has done research on the deportations and extermination of the Norwegian Jews during World War II. Bjarte Bruland was a member of the Skarpnes commission in the period 1996–97. He was the director of the Jewish museum in Trondheim from 2016 to 2017. While finishing his doctoral thesis, he was the chief curator at the Jewish Museum in Oslo.

Works
 Forsøket på å tilintetgjøre de norske jødene Hovedfagsoppgave ved Universitetet i Bergen 1995
 The Reisel/Bruland report on the confiscation of Jewish property 1997
 Holocaust i Norge 2002 Online edition:
 Det norske holocaust : jødedeportasjonen 2003

References 

1969 births
Living people
20th-century Norwegian historians
21st-century Norwegian historians